Ivan Pišvejc (born 1978) is a Czech slalom canoeist who competed at the international level from 1994 to 2010.

He won three medals at the ICF Canoe Slalom World Championships with a gold (K1 team: 2009) and two bronzes (K1: 2002, K1 team: 2007). He also won a silver and a bronze in the K1 team event at the European Championships.

World Cup individual podiums

References

External links
12 September 2009 final results for the men's K1 team event at the 2009 ICF Canoe Slalom World Championships. - accessed 12 September 2009.

Czech male canoeists
Living people
1978 births
Medalists at the ICF Canoe Slalom World Championships